Q88 may refer to:
 Q88 (New York City bus)
 Al-Ghashiyah